Rare Metals is a populated place in Coconino County, Arizona, United States.

References

Unincorporated communities in Coconino County, Arizona
Unincorporated communities in Arizona